There have been over 800 rugby league footballers that have played for the Parramatta Eels club since its introduction to the premiership in 1947. The club maintains an official players register, which lists them by their official player number.

Players (since 1947)

References

External links
Player Numbers 1947 to Present at parraeels.com

 
Lists of Australian rugby league players
National Rugby League lists
Sydney-sport-related lists